Yuraklar jangi - Battle of hearts is an Uzbek drama series produced by Ruslan Mirzayev that premiered on Sevimli TV on December 5, 2018. The series consists of two seasons and aired from October 5, 2018 to August 6, 2019.

The series was shot in collaboration with Turkish filmmakers in Turkey and Uzbekistan. The filmmakers, who initially announced the filming of the series "Güneşim benim", later told to media that they did not have the funds to shoot the series. The filmmakers have agreed to co-produce "Yuraklar jangi" instead of "Güneşim benim".

Cast 
 Umid Irgashev as Tohir
 Saida Rametova as Nozima, Tohir's mother
 Azim Yo'ldoshev as Ali
 Rayhon Ulasenova as Sanam
 Sitora Alimjonova as Shirina
 Ozod Shams as Ahror
 Zuhra Nasrullayeva as Zuhra
 Azamat Qodirov as Ravshan, Ali's friend
 Baxshillo Fatullayev as Jasur
 Jahongir Muhtorov as Husayn
 Mömin Rizo as Bobur
 Sardor Zoirov as Doniyor
 Gulruh Pirnazarova as Zanjabila
 Akmal Mirzo as Shukur
Ali Asghar Shah as Asghar
 Muhlisa Sohibova as Shukur's mother
 Fotima Nazarova as maidservant Munira
 Dilbar Ikromova as Umida hola
 Begzod Inog'omov as Botir

References

External links
 

Uzbek-language television shows
Television series set in the 2010s